Astrid Sommer (née Christiansen; 21 May 1906 – 9 April 1990) was a Norwegian actress.

She was born in Kristiania to Carl Christiansen and Agnes Mathilde Rosendahl, and was married to actor Alf Marius Sommer.

Sommer was assigned with Det Norske Teatret for more than fifty years. Her breakthrough was the character "Krestna" in Oskar Braaten's play Ungen in 1929. Among her other characters were "Kvitugla" in Olav Duun's Medmenneske (several times between 1937 and 1976), "Maren Dokter" in Arne Garborg's Læraren (in 1943, 1948 and 1951), and "Smikkstugun" in Alf Prøysens Trost i taklampa (1952 and 1963).  She played "Bernarda" (The House of Bernarda Alba) "Mother Aase" (Peer Gynt) and "Mother Courage". Her films include Ungen (1938), Godvakker-Maren (1940), Trysil-Knut (1942),  Trost i taklampa (1955) and Hans Nielsen Hauge (1961).

References

1906 births
1990 deaths
Actresses from Oslo
Norwegian stage actresses
Norwegian film actresses